Jack Cashill (born December 15, 1947) is an American author, blogger and conspiracy theorist. He is a weekly contributor to WorldNetDaily and Executive Editor of Ingram's Magazine, a business publication based in Kansas City, Missouri.

Biography
Cashill was born and raised in Newark, New Jersey to William and Frances Cashill. He graduated from Regis High School in New York City and Siena College in Loudonville, New York. Cashill received his Ph.D. in American Studies from Purdue University in 1982. He is of Irish descent. He has written for Fortune, The Washington Post, The Wall Street Journal, and The Weekly Standard. He has taught media and literature at Purdue and at other universities in the Kansas City area.

Cashill, in the book Deconstructing Obama (2011), promoted the theory that Bill Ayers, co-founder of the militant radical left-wing organization Weather Underground, had authored President Barack Obama's autobiography Dreams from My Father. A review by Craig Fehrman in The Washington Post argued that "Cashill’s clues are far from convincing" on the supposed involvement of Ayers; Fehrman also described the book itself as being "grotesque, delusional and paranoid". Eric McHenry, writing for Salon  accused Cashill of believing "Obama’s entire life is one massive fraud" and exclusively applying this notion to Obama's writings; Cashill had claimed at least one of Obama's few poems were really the work of Frank Marshall Davis.

TWA 800: The Crash, The Cover Up, The Conspiracy, a book written by Cashill, was published in July 2016 by Regnery. The Pitch described Cashill as a conspiracy theorist; he promotes the theory that TWA 800 was hit by a missile and doubted the veracity of Barack Obama's published birth certificate. First Strike (2003), Cashill's earlier book on the crash of TWA Flight 800, alleged the real cause had been covered up to stop Bill Clinton from losing the 1996 presidential election. In a 2004 documentary Mega Fix, he alleged additionally that cover-ups by President Clinton concerning the Oklahoma City bombing in 1995 and the Atlanta Olympics bombing the following year, contributed to the September 11 attacks. He implies the 1995 and 1996 attacks were the actions of Islamic terrorists. 

Cashill's 2020 book Unmasking Obama (Post Hill Press) attempts to refute assertions that the Obama presidency was scandal-free, and indicts the press for turning a blind eye to several Obama scandals, chiefly Obama's alleged efforts to undermine the 2016 presidential election in favor of Hillary Clinton, and the subsequent cover-up and simultaneous efforts to overthrow the presidency of Donald Trump by the Obama-directed leaders of the National Security Agency, Federal Bureau of Investigation, and Central Intelligence Agency.

Bibliography

References

External links

1947 births
Living people
American investigative journalists
American conspiracy theorists
American people of Irish descent
Writers from Newark, New Jersey
Purdue University alumni
Siena College alumni